Alexander Schroff (born 13 June 1962) is a Swiss sailor. He competed in the Flying Dutchman event at the 1988 Summer Olympics.

References

External links
 

1962 births
Living people
Swiss male sailors (sport)
Olympic sailors of Switzerland
Sailors at the 1988 Summer Olympics – Flying Dutchman
Place of birth missing (living people)